Sir Monoux Cope, 7th Baronet  (c. 1696 – 1763) was a  British  politician who sat in the   House of Commons between 1722 and 1747.

Cope was the eldest son of Sir John Cope, 6th Baronet and his wife Alice Monoux, daughter of Sir Humphrey Monoux, 2nd Baronet of Wootton, Bedfordshire.

Cope was elected Member of Parliament for Banbury on his family's interest at the 1722 general election, succeeding a distant cousin Sir Jonathan Cope. He did not stand in 1727. At the 1741 general election he was returned unopposed as MP for Newport (Isle of Wight) on the government interest.

Cope succeeded his father in the baronetcy on 8 December 1749. He died on 29 June 1763, aged 67. He married Penelope Mordaunt on 27 July 1726  and had two sons and was succeeded in the baronetcy by his son John.

References

1690s births
1763 deaths
British MPs 1722–1727
British MPs 1741–1747
Members of Parliament for Newport (Isle of Wight)
Baronets in the Baronetage of England